Nekathi Kumbukwewa Grama Niladhari Division is a Grama Niladhari Division of the Ambanpola Divisional Secretariat of Kurunegala District of North Western Province, Sri Lanka. It has Grama Niladhari Division Code 172.

Nekathi Kumbukwewa is a surrounded by the Kettapahuwa, Udagama, Waduressa, Walaliya and Palapathwala Grama Niladhari Divisions.

Demographics

Ethnicity 
The Nekathi Kumbukwewa Grama Niladhari Division has a Sinhalese majority (100.0%). In comparison, the Ambanpola Divisional Secretariat (which contains the Nekathi Kumbukwewa Grama Niladhari Division) has a Sinhalese majority (98.3%)

Religion 
The Nekathi Kumbukwewa Grama Niladhari Division has a Buddhist majority (100.0%). In comparison, the Ambanpola Divisional Secretariat (which contains the Nekathi Kumbukwewa Grama Niladhari Division) has a Buddhist majority (97.5%)

References 

Grama Niladhari Divisions of Ambanpola Divisional Secretariat